Joseph John Crowell (September 18, 1780 – June 25, 1846) was born in Halifax County, North Carolina. He was educated locally. In the War of 1812, he helped to recruit a regiment and was commissioned as a colonel.  He moved to Alabama in 1815, serving as Congressional Delegate from the Alabama Territory. In the election of 1818, he became the first member of the House of Representatives from the new state of Alabama. When he retired after one term in 1821, President James Monroe appointed him the United States Indian agent to the Creek Indians. He died at Fort Mitchell, Alabama in 1846.

References

External links

|-

1780 births
1846 deaths
19th-century American politicians
Delegates to the United States House of Representatives from Alabama Territory
Democratic-Republican Party members of the United States House of Representatives from Alabama
People from Halifax County, North Carolina